"Why I Had to Pass This Way" is a single by Canadian country music artist Carroll Baker. Released in 1976, it was the fifth single from her album Carroll Baker. The song reached number one on the RPM Country Tracks chart in Canada in November 1976.

Chart performance

References

1976 singles
1976 songs
Carroll Baker songs
RCA Records singles
Songs written by Don Grashey